The following is an incomplete list of massacres that have occurred in present-day Germany and its predecessors:

Massacres up until the year 1000 
The following is a list of massacres that have occurred in the territory of the present-day Germany before the year 1000:

Massacres during the First Crusade of 1096 

In May and June 1096, during the Rhineland massacres, about 2,000–2,800 Jews have been killed by mobs of German and sometimes French Christians of the People's Crusade or committed suicide to avoid baptism. Up to 95% of all killings happened between May 25 and June 1 in the three massacres of Worms, Speyer and Cologne. At least 1,600 killings are well testified, but some estimates run up to 5,000 or even 10,000 victims, thus annihilating about 1/4 to 1/3 of the Ashkenazi population of the time. In Jewish historiography, these events are referred to as Gezerot Tatnu which means "the edicts of [the year 4]856" of the Jewish calendar. The first persecutions of this group happened in late 1095 in France (Rouen riot of [December?] 1095, a smaller massacre there happening in September 1096 only, when the Rhineland massacres were over), than in Reims, Verdun and Metz (22 killed in June 1096), the latter two cities not yet belonging to France at that time. The key person of the Rhineland massacres was Count Emicho von Leiningen who led undisciplined troops of up to 10,000 crusaders.

Massacres during the Years 1097 to 1347

Black Death Jewish persecutions 1348 to 1351 

These series of massacres, which resulted in the partial or complete destruction of 210 Jewish communities in the Rhineland and 350 in all of Germany, started in Southern France (Toulon, April 1348) and Spain (Barcelona), than spread to Switzerland and South West Germany. 510 events documented all over Europe.

Massacres of the 15th Century

Massacres of the 16th to 18th Century

Massacres between 1800 and 1933

Killings and Massacres in Nazi Germany 1933–1945 

Most of the atrocities of this time happened outside of Germany, especially in Eastern Europe.

Killings in Germany after 1945

References

See also

 The Holocaust, List of Nazi concentration camps, :Category:World War II prisoner of war camps in Germany
 German war crimes, War crimes of the Wehrmacht, Nazi crimes against Soviet POWs, :Category:Nazi war crimes
 Extermination through labor, Forced labour under German rule during World War II

Germany
Massacres

Massacres